Dehestan-e Pain (also Romanized as Dehestān-e Pā’īn or Dehesān-e Pāyīn) is a village in Dar Agah Rural District, in the Central District of Hajjiabad County, Hormozgan Province, Iran. At the 2006 census, its population was 884, in 194 families.

References 

Populated places in Hajjiabad County